William Edwin "Jiggs" Parson (December 27, 1885 – May 19, 1967) was an American professional baseball pitcher. He played two seasons in Major League Baseball (MLB) with the Boston Doves / Rustlers, a National League team later known as the Boston Braves. His professional career spanned 1907 to 1916.

Also nicknamed "Chief", Parson was born in 1885 played baseball for and graduated from Bucknell University in 1908. He died in 1967 and was survived by a son and daughter.

References

External links

1885 births
1959 deaths
People from Turner County, South Dakota
Baseball players from South Dakota
Bucknell Bison baseball players
Major League Baseball pitchers
Boston Doves players
Boston Rustlers players
Oil City Oilers players
Lima Cigarmakers players
Marion Diggers players
Lowell Tigers players
Montreal Royals players
Memphis Chickasaws players
Troy Trojans (minor league) players
Scranton Miners players
Harrisburg Islanders players